Lara Sanders may refer to:

 LaToya Sanders or Lara Sanders (born 1986), American-Turkish basketball player
 Lara Juliette Sanders, German director, producer and TV personality